Vishwas Narayan Nangare-Patil is an Indian Police Service officer. He serves as the Additional Director General of Police in the Anti-corruption Bureau, Maharashtra. Previously he was Joint Commissioner of Police (Law & Order), Mumbai. Formerly he was Commissioner of Police, Nashik city. Patil completed his training in1997. In 2015 he was awarded the President's Police Medal (gallantry) for his role in the counterterrorist operations during the 2008 Mumbai attacks.

Career

Nangare-Patil was deputy commissioner of police Zone-1 in South Mumbai during the attack. He confronted the terrorists at Taj hotel. He shot one of them in the leg. During this fight with the terrorists, they shot down one of Nangare's bodyguards and injured one. He had barged in there without any bulletproof vest only with a Glock and if he had not done it people would have died in the marriage hall known as crystal hall.

Positions held
Additional Commissioner of Police - Anti-Corruption Bureau
Additional Commissioner of Police - Mumbai.

Superintendent of Police - Thane Rural (2010–11).

Superintendent of Police - Latur (2002–04)
Additional Superintendent of Police - Nanded
Assistant Superintendent of Police - Dhule

Books
Mann Mein Hai Vishwas (hindi).
Kar Har Maidan Fateh (hindi).

References

External links

Indian police officers
Living people
1973 births